The Machine is an upcoming American action comedy film directed by Peter Atencio inspired by the 2016 stand-up routine of the same name created by Bert Kreischer, who also stars as a fictionalized version of himself. The film also stars Mark Hamill, Jess Gabor, Jimmy Tatro, Stephanie Kurtzuba and Mercedes De La Cruz.

Following its viral success, Legendary Entertainment acquired the rights of Kreischer's true story stand-up routine into a feature film adaptation in September 2019. Most of the lead cast members were hired from April to June 2021. Filming began in Serbia in April 2021 through Balkanic Media.

The Machine is scheduled to be released on May 26, 2023, by Screen Gems.

Premise
Bert Kreischer and his father are kidnapped by those Bert wronged 20 years ago while drunk on a college semester abroad in Russia.

Cast
 Bert Kreischer as himself
 Mark Hamill as Albert Kreischer, Sr., Bert's father.
 Jessica Gabor as Georgia Kreischer, Bert’s eldest daughter
 Jimmy Tatro as a young Bert Kreischer
 Iva Babić as a mobster 
 Stephanie Kurtzuba 
 Nikola Đuričko
 Oleg Taktarov
 Robert Maaser
 Rita Bernard Shaw
 Amelie Villers
 Mercedes De La Cruz
 Tea Wagner

Production

Development
On September 16, 2019, Legendary Entertainment acquired the rights to develop comedian Bert Kreischer's true story stand-up routine into a feature film adaptation following its viral success. On April 13, 2021, Peter Atencio was hired to directed and produced the film with Kreischer and Judi Marmel. Kevin Biegel and Scotty Landes wrote the film.

Casting
On April 13, 2021, Kreischer was set to play himself and Mark Hamill was cast as Bert’s father, Albert Kreischer Sr. On April 27, 2021, Jess Gabor was cast as Bert’s daughter. On May 5, 2021, Stephanie Kurtzuba was cast in the film. In June 2021, Mercedes De La Cruz and Jimmy Tatro cast in the film.

Filming
Principal photography on the film began in Serbia in April 2021 through Balkanic Media.

Music
On February 15, 2022, Joseph Trapanese was announced to composed the film's original score.

Release
The Machine is scheduled to be released on May 26, 2023 by Screen Gems.

References

External links
 
 

American action comedy films
Comedy films based on actual events
2020s English-language films
Films about the Russian Mafia
Films scored by Joseph Trapanese
Films set in Russia
Films shot in Serbia
Legendary Pictures films
Screen Gems films
Upcoming films